The San Jose Red Sox were a Boston Red Sox affiliate from 1947 to 1955, located in San Jose, California. They competed in the California League and they played at San Jose Municipal Stadium and won league championships in 1949 and 1953. After the end of their Red Sox affiliation, they changed the team name to the San Jose JoSox for two seasons before becoming the San Jose Pirates as a Pittsburgh Pirates affiliate in 1958. They moved to Las Vegas, Nevada on May 26, 1958 to become the Las Vegas Wranglers.

San Jose would return to baseball when the San Jose Bees began operations in 1962.

Notable alumni

 Joe DeMaestri (1947-1948) MLB All-Star

 Dick Gernert (1950)

Marty Keough (1952-1953)

 Bob Lee (1957) MLB All-Star

 Marv Owen (1947-1951)

 Albie Pearson (1953) MLB All-Star; 1958 AL Rookie of the Year

 Frank Sullivan (1948-1949) 2 x MLB All-Star

 Bob Veale (1958) 2 x MLB All-Star

 Earl Wilson (1954)

Year-by-year record

External links
Baseball Reference

Defunct California League teams
Baseball teams established in 1947
Baseball teams in San Jose, California
Sports clubs disestablished in 1958
1947 establishments in California
1955 disestablishments in California
Defunct baseball teams in California
Boston Red Sox minor league affiliates
Pittsburgh Pirates minor league affiliates
Baseball teams disestablished in 1958